Xarel·lo is a white grape variety of Spanish origin specially grown in Catalonia. It is a cross between Brustiano faux and 'Gibi',  a synonym for the Spanish Hebén grape.

With Macabeo and Parellada, Xarel·lo is one of the three traditional varieties used to make the sparkling wine cava. Xarel·lo wine can be strongly flavored and is more aromatic than the other two cava grape varieties.

While historically the grape was only produced as part of regional blend in Penedès and Cava, modern winemaking has evolved in the last 20 years to where it is being seen in the form of varietal wines. High-end Cavas have been produced which feature the grape prominently such as Gramona's Enoteca or then as 100% of the finished wine in: Sabaté i Coca's Reserva Familiar, Recaredo's Turó d'en Mota and Mas del Serral from Raventos i Blanc.

Synonyms 
Xarel·lo is also known by the following synonyms: Cartoixà, Cartuja, Pansa, Pansa Blanca, Pansal, Premsal Blanca, Xarelo Blanco, Xerello.

References 

Spanish wine
Grape varieties of Spain
White wine grape varieties